Jeremiah Colman (1777–1851) was a miller who invented Colman's mustard.

Jeremiah Colman may also refer to:
Sir Jeremiah Colman, 1st Baronet (1859–1942)
Sir Jeremiah Colman, 2nd Baronet, of the Colman baronets
Jeremiah Colman (MP) (1830–1898)

See also
Colman (disambiguation)